Erik Martin Ulander (born 23 February 1976) is a Swedish former footballer who played as a midfielder. He represented Jönköpings Södra IF, IFK Göteborg, Örgryte IS, and Aarhus GF during a career that spanned between 1993 and 2006. A full international between 2001 and 2003, he won four caps for the Sweden national team.

References

1976 births
Living people
Swedish footballers
Jönköpings Södra IF players
IFK Göteborg players
Örgryte IS players
Aarhus Gymnastikforening players
Association football midfielders
Swedish expatriate footballers
Expatriate men's footballers in Denmark
Swedish expatriate sportspeople in Denmark
Allsvenskan players
Danish Superliga players
Sweden international footballers
People from Jönköping
Sportspeople from Jönköping County